The following is a list of programs and films currently and formerly broadcast on Great American Family. The list also includes programming aired when the network was known as Great American Country.

Original films

2021

2022

(AH) Autumn Harvest

2023

Current programming

Original programming

Drama
When Hope Calls (season 2; December 18, 2021–present, acquired from Crown Media)

Syndicated programming
Shows currently broadcast on GAC Family include several sitcoms under an agreement with CBS Media Ventures, NBCUniversal Television Distribution, Sony Pictures Television and Warner Bros. Television:

Sitcoms
Bewitched
The Facts of Life
Father Knows Best
Full House
Fuller House
Hazel
I Dream of Jeannie
The Lone Ranger
Silver Spoons
Who's the Boss?

Dramas
Columbo
Little House on the Prairie
Murder, She Wrote

Upcoming programming

In Development
Christmas Royal Ball
Christmas by Chance

Former programming

As Great American Country
All-American Amusement Parks (2014)
Aloha Builds
Barn Hunters
Barnwood Builders
Behind the Scenes (1997-2004)
Betty White's Smartest Animals in America (2015)
Big Wheels of Country (2003-2005)
Carnival Eats
Celebrity Kitchen with Lorianne Crook (2003-2005)
Celebrity Motor Homes
Country Music Across America (2003-2008)
Country Requests Live (2000-2005)
Crook & Chase (2003-2005)
Design on a Dime
Endless Yard Sale Showdown 
Farm Kings
Fast Forward (1997-2005)
GAC Classic (2001-2006)
GAC Late Shift
GAC Nights
GAC Outdoor Country
Gaither Gospel Hour
Great American Roadhouse (2002-2003)
Growing Up Gator
Headline Country
The Hitmen of Music Row (2007)
Hot Country Nights (2004)
I Brake for Yard Sales
Inside Country (1998-2000)
Into the Circle
The Jennie Garth Project
Junk Gypsies
Kimberly's Simply Southern 
KingBilly (2008)
Lakefront Bargain Hunt
Living Countryfied
Log Cabin Living
Made in America (2003-2004)
Main Street Videos
Master Series
Moving Country
My Music Mix (2005-2009)
Next GAC Star (2008)
Offstage with Lorianne Crook (2005-2007)
Oh That Dog of Mine! (1999)
On the Edge of Country (1997-2008)
Our Song (2009)
On the Streets
Opry Live
Patriotic Country (2004)
Pick a Puppy
Positively GAC
The Road Hammers (2008)
Soundstage
Superstar Sessions
Tiny House, Big Living
Top 15 Country Countdown (1997-2001)
Top 20 Country Countdown (2004-2018)
Top 50 Videos of the Year
Tori and Dean: Cabin Fever
Ultimate Sportman's Lodge
Wake Up Call Videos
The Willis Clan
Wrangler National Finals Rodeo
The Year

As GAC Family/Great American Family 
Bonanza
The Beverly Hillbillies

Specials

As GAC Family/Great American Family
 Welcome to Great American Christmas (2021)
 When Hope Calls: Hearties Christmas Present (2021)
 Great American Christmas in Kentucky (2022)
 Great American Rescue Bowl (2023)

References

External links
Great American Family

GAC Family